Zora Kostková (also known as Zorka Kostková; born 16 February 1952) is a Czech actress. She joined the J. K. Tyl Theatre in 1974. Kostková was awarded the Vendelín Budil Prize in 2005, later being recognised with the Bohumil Kulhánek plaque from the municipal district of Plzeň 3 in 2008.  As well as acting, she has co-written a children's book, "Mlhášek", which is in Czech and French. She taught at Konzervatoř Plzeň for seven years, as well as working with the University of West Bohemia.

Selected filmography
Život na zámku (television, 1997–2000)
Ordinace v růžové zahradě (television, 2009–2013)

References

External links

1952 births
Living people
Czech stage actresses
Czechoslovak stage actresses
Czech television actresses
Actors from Plzeň
20th-century Czech actresses
21st-century Czech actresses
Academic staff of the University of West Bohemia